C. Wonder is a fashion retailer founded by J. Christopher Burch in 2011.

Merchandise

C. Wonder sells women's clothing, accessories, as well as home decor items. The stores also sells electronics and other products, leading The New Yorker to label the company as "the World's Fair of retail". Personalization of the merchandise in C. Wonder stores includes monogramming your initials on their clothing and belt buckle customization. More expansive items such as pillows, table ware, art books, and picnic baskets have also been sold.

History and Operations

The founding and opening of C. Wonder was in 2010. In July 2011 the first C. Wonder signs were posted on the exterior of a storefront on Spring Street in New York City, with a website posted describing the plans for C. Wonder's concept and line. On October 22, 2011 C. Wonder launched its original 7,200 square foot location in Manhattan, featuring fitting rooms with touch screens where customers could adjust the lighting or change the music while trying on the clothing. C. Wonder also introduced store wide check-out capabilities for its sales associates via mobile points of sale (mPOS), allowing sales associates to check-out customers via iPod touches anywhere in the store.

Architectural Digest called the store "the next generation of shopping", writing that the store also allowed customers to monogram their merchandise and that a retail website would launch soon. The first store was designed in an empty factory an hour outside of Shanghai, China, and then shipped to New York for the grand opening. This was the first US retail store to ever be entirely produced and manufactured in China. In September 2012 C. Wonder launched its second flagship store in Time Warner Center. The space moved into part of the building previously occupied by Borders and covered more than 8,000 square feet. Burch has stated that C. Wonder stores are designed on the principle of disrupting the traditional retail environment. Part of C. Wonder's retail strategy is to open up seasonal pop up stores in places like Southampton in New York State and Nantucket in Massachusetts, in addition to their permanent stores. The first California location of C. Wonder opened in August 2012 at the Fashion Island Mall located in Newport Beach. In 2012, C. Wonder opened eight new stores in total.

C. Wonder stores regularly host charitable events to help local charities. In February 2012, a C. Wonder store in Paramus, New Jersey hosted a private shopping even where 10% of sales went to the Gilda's Club Northern New Jersey cancer support organization.

In November 2013, C. Wonder signed a "licensing agreement with Al Tayer to open stores in the Middle East, such as the Mall of the Emirates, in Dubai, in early Spring 2014. Vince Montemarano, senior vice president of international at C. Wonder, said stores in "the Middle East, Latin America and Asia will be franchised".

, in the U.S., C. Wonder operates 30 stores.

On November 21, 2014, it was revealed that C. Wonder would significantly reduce their domestic retail operations.  C. Wonder made no official announcement, but a report surfaced a day later detailing the locations likely to close.

In January 2015, the company filed for bankruptcy.

People

The President of C. Wonder was Andrea Hyde until March 2014. Also, a past president was Amy Shecter. The founder J. Christopher Burch began his career in the fashion world in 1976, when he launched Eagle’s Eye—a company that eventually established retails stores across the US. Burch also co-founded the Tory Burch fashion house, as well as ventures like Jawbone cellular phone accessories and Powermat Technologies.

Television
On June 3, 2012, C. Wonder was featured in the television program The Pitch, a reality television show airing on the AMC television network. During this episode, two advertising agencies pitched to founder J. Christopher Burch to become the advertising agency for C. Wonder. The two firms bidding for the business were Womenkind and the winner Digo. The slogan for the Digo pitch was "A Great Mood Can Change the World".

Controversies
The founder of C. Wonder has been involved in a lawsuit with his ex-wife, regarding potential similarities between the C. Wonder and Tory Burch brands. At the time of the lawsuit, J. Christopher Burch was still Chairman of the Board for Tory Burch. In October 2012, J. Christopher Burch launched a lawsuit against Tory Burch,  accusing them of blocking his attempts to sell part of his shares in Tory Burch and claiming that C. Wonder's price point is much lower than Tory Burch products, preventing him from competing with the brand. This lawsuit, as well as all pending legal claims between the C. Wonder founder and his ex-wife, was settled on December 31, 2012.

Awards
Accessories Council Excellence Award for Speciality Retailer of the Year, 2012.

References

Further reading

External links
 C. Wonder website

Clothing retailers of the United States
Companies that filed for Chapter 11 bankruptcy in 2015